CEC may refer to:

Organisations
 California Energy Commission, US
 Canadian Electroacoustic Community
 Center for Elephant Conservation, Florida, US
 Charismatic Episcopal Church
 China Enterprise Confederation
 Citizens Electoral Council, a political party in Australia now known as Australian Citizens Party
 Civil Engineer Corps, of the US Navy
 City of Edinburgh Council
 Commission for Environmental Cooperation, an intergovernmental environmental organization
Commonwealth Engineers Council, a network of professional Commonwealth engineering organisations
 Conference of European Churches

Education
 Association Citizens Educational Center, a non-profit organization in Bosnia and Herzegovina
 Canadian Ecology Centre
 Career Enrichment Center, an Albuquerque Public Schools Magnet High School, US
 Cebu Eastern College, Cebu City, Philippines
 Central European Convention, a subgroup of the International Association for the Exchange of Students for Technical Experience
 Centro de Educación Continua at the National Polytechnic School, Quito, Ecuador
 Chinese Education Center, an elementary school in San Francisco, California, US
 Cobequid Educational Centre, a high school in Truro, Nova Scotia, Canada
 College of Engineering Chengannur, Kerala, India
 College of Engineering, Cherthala, Kerala, India
 Cranbrook Educational Community, Detroit, US

Elections
 Central Election Commission (Taiwan), for Taiwan
 Central Election Commission (Ukraine), for Ukraine
 Central Election Commission of the Russian Federation, for Russia
 Central Election Committee, for India
 Chief Election Commissioner of India
 Central Elections Committee (Israel), for Israel

Companies
 Career Education Corporation, a US postsecondary higher education provider
 Caesars Entertainment Corporation, a US gaming corporation
 CEC Bank, a Romanian bank
 China Electronics Corporation, a Chinese telecom company
 Chuck E. Cheese, a chain of American family entertainment center restaurants, a brand of CEC Entertainment
 Clean Energy Collective, a US clean energy company
 Community Education Centers, a former private for-profit prison company based in New Jersey, US
 Continental Engineering Corporation, a Taiwanese Construction Company
 Círculo de Escritores Cinematográficos, a private non-profit
 Consolidated Engineering Corporation, a former private company for chemical instruments

Science and technology
 Canadian Electrical Code
 Cation-exchange capacity, in soil sciences
 Circulating endothelial cell, endothelial cells that have been shed from the lining of the vascular wall into the blood stream
 Consumer Electronics Control, a part of the HDMI interface specification
 Cooperative Engagement Capability, a military target information sharing network

Other uses
 Cambridge English Corpus, a text corpus of English language
 Camouflage Europe Centrale, the standard camouflage pattern of the French military
 Canadian Engineering Competition, of the Canadian Federation of Engineering Students
 Certified Executive Chef, an American Culinary Federation (ACF) certification
 Concordance Extraction Corporation, a fictional deep space mining company in the video game Dead Space
 Consol Energy Center, an indoor arena in Pittsburgh, Pennsylvania, US
 Continuing Education Credit, a measure used in continuing education
 Cruzeiro Esporte Clube, a Brazilian football club
 IATA code "CEC" for Del Norte County Airport
 IEEE Congress on Evolutionary Computation, a conference

See also
 Commission of the European Communities (EC)